Megathymus yuccae, the  yucca giant-skipper, is a rare early season butterfly that is widespread across the southern United States. It belongs in the family Hesperiidae, subfamily Megathyminae.

Description
The upper side of the wings are brown with the forewings having yellow spots. The under side is mainly mottled with black and gray. Caterpillars feed on Yucca species such as Y. filamentosa, Y. smalliana, Y. gloriosa, Y. elata, Y. arizonica, and Y. aloifolia. Although adults do not feed, males will gather moisture from mud.

Habitat
This butterfly may be seen in deserts, foothills, and woodlands where yucca plants, in which their eggs are laid, occur.

References

External links

 http://www.jeffpippen.com/butterflies/yuccagiantskipper.htm Jeff's Nature Pages
 http://michaelbeohm.tripod.com/id100.html
 http://bugguide.net/node/view/177233/bgimage
 Yucca giant-skipper on the UF / IFAS Featured Creatures Web site

Megathyminae
Butterflies described in 1837
Butterflies of North America